Louis Treumann (born Alois Pollitzer, 3 March 1872 – 5 March 1943) was an Austrian actor and operetta tenor. Born in Vienna, was the son of Jewish merchants. He spent his twenties working backstage and in smaller roles, before achieving his breakthrough in 1902 in Franz Lehár's  opposite Mizzi Günther. 

In 1905 he created the role of Count Danilo Danilovitsch in Lehár's Die lustige Witwe (The Merry Widow). 

During the second half of the 1920s he appeared in several films, such as Der Rastelbinder (1927), Flucht in die Fremdenlegion (1929), Spiel um den Mann (1929), Trust der Diebe (1929), Katharina Knie (1929) and Die Warschauer Zitadelle (1930). During the 1930s, as a Jew, his opportunities to perform suffered, and his final appearance was in 1935.

In 1942 he was arrested and taken to a transit camp. His colleague, the actor Theo Lingen was able to get him released, but soon afterwards he was arrested again. He was repeatedly scheduled for transport to a concentration camp, each time saved by influential friends such as Franz Lehár. However on 28 July 1942, aged 70 years old, Treumann was finally deported to Theresienstadt together with his wife Stefanie. She died just two months later, and her death plunged Treumann into a deep depression. A few months later, on 5 March 1943, still in the Theresienstadt concentration camp, he too died.

In 1955, Treumanngasse in Vienna's Hietzing district was named after him.

Recordings 
 Franz Lehár, "O Vaterland, du machst bei Tag" from The Merry Widow. Louis Treumann and Orchestra, cond. Franz Hampe (1906) (MP3; 1.3 MB)
 Franz Lehár, "Lippen schweigen" from The Merry Widow. Mizzi Günther, Louis Treumann and Orchestra, cond. Franz Hampe (1906) (MP3; 1.7 MB)

References 
 Ludwig Eisenberg: Großes biographisches Lexikon der Deutschen Bühne im XIX. Jahrhundert. Paul List, Leipzig 1903, p.1049,
 Felix Czeike: Historisches Lexikon Wien. Kremayr & Scheriau, Wien 1997,  (Band 5), p.476
 Christian Fastl: Treumann, Louis in: Oesterreichisches Musiklexikon. Printed edition: Volume 5, Austrian Academy of Sciences, Vienna 2006,  
 Kay Weniger: Zwischen Bühne und Baracke. Lexikon der verfolgten Theater-, Film- und Musikkünstler 1933 bis 1945. Foreword by Paul Spiegel. Metropol, Berlin 2008, p.351
 Karl-Josef Kutsch, Leo Riemens: Großes Sängerlexikon. Third edition, Berlin 2000, p.24453ff

External links 
 
 Treumann, Louis (eig. Pollitzer, Alois) (in German) Oesterreichisches Musiklexikon

1872 births
1943 deaths
Austrian male film actors
Austrian male stage actors
Austrian people who died in the Theresienstadt Ghetto
Austrian tenors
Jewish Austrian male actors
20th-century Austrian male actors
20th-century Austrian male opera singers